Sir Christopher Booth (1924–2012) was a British clinician and medical historian.

Christopher Booth may also refer to:

 Chris Booth (born 1948), New Zealand sculptor

See also
Christopher Boothe, fictional character in Passions